17M may refer to:

New York State Route 17M
The Su-17M, a Soviet fighter plane; see Sukhoi Su-17 
The La-17M, a Soviet drone; see Lavochkin La-17
The 17M engine, an engine model in the 1957-1971 Ford Taunus
The DC-17M, a fictional weapon in the game Star Wars: Republic Commando

See also
 M17 (disambiguation)